Alfred Black may refer to:

 Alfred Black (cricketer) (died 1859), Australian cricketer
 Alfred Black (sport shooter) (1856–1912), British Olympic sports shooter